Benny Sudakov (born October 1969) is an Israeli mathematician, who works mainly on Hungarian-style combinatorics.

He was born in Tbilissi, Georgia, and completed his undergraduate studies at Tbilisi State University in 1990. After emigrating to Israel, he received his PhD from Tel Aviv University in 1999, under the supervision of Noga Alon.
From 1999 until 2002 he held a Veblen Research Instructorship, a joint position between Princeton University and the Institute for Advanced Study. Until 2007 he was an assistant professor at Princeton University. Until 2014, he was a professor at the University of California, Los Angeles. In July 2013 Sudakov joined ETH Zurich as a professor.

Sudakov has broad interests within the field of combinatorics, having written papers on extremal combinatorics, Ramsey theory, random graphs, and positional games.

In 2012 he became a Fellow of the American Mathematical Society.

He gave an invited talk at the International Congress of Mathematicians in 2010 at Hyderabad, on the topic of "Combinatorics".

References

External links
 

Living people
20th-century Israeli mathematicians
21st-century Israeli mathematicians
Combinatorialists
Tel Aviv University alumni
University of California, Los Angeles faculty
Academic staff of ETH Zurich
Fellows of the American Mathematical Society
Princeton University faculty
Institute for Advanced Study people
Scientists from Tbilisi
Tbilisi State University alumni
1969 births
Georgian emigrants to Israel